Notoreas arcuata is a species of geometer moth endemic to New Zealand. This species if found in the South Island and has been observed in the Saint Arnaud Range, around Arthur's Pass and in the Oteake Conservation Park. Larvae feed on species in the genera Kelleria and Pimelea. Adults are on the wing from December to February.

Taxonomy
This species was described by Alfred Philpott in 1921 using material collected in the Saint Arnaud Range by Mr R. Grimmett. George Hudson also discussed and illustrated this species in his book The Butterflies and Moths of New Zealand. J. S. Dugdale disputes that the illustration by Hudson in his book is of N. arcuata. The genus Notoreas was reviewed in 1986 by R. C. Craw and the placement of this species within it was confirmed. However species within the genus Notoreas are currently regarded as being in need of revision. The holotype specimen is held at the New Zealand Arthropod Collection.

Description

Philpott described the species as follows:

Distribution
This species is endemic to New Zealand. Other than its type locality of the Saint Arnaud Range, the species has also been found at Arthur's Pass and the Oteake Conservation Park.

Biology and behaviour
This species is on the wing from December to February.

Habitat and host species
Larvae in the genus Notoreas feed on woody plants in the genera Kelleria and Pimelea (daphe family).

References

Moths described in 1921
Moths of New Zealand
Larentiinae
Endemic fauna of New Zealand
Endemic moths of New Zealand
Taxa named by Alfred Philpott